Henri Hermans (born 3 March 1919) was a Belgian basketball player. He competed in the men's tournament at the 1948 Summer Olympics.

References

External links
 

1919 births
Possibly living people
Belgian men's basketball players
Olympic basketball players of Belgium
Basketball players at the 1948 Summer Olympics
Sportspeople from Brussels